Robinson Mill (also, Robinson Mills, Robinson Ranch, Robinson Sawmill, Robinsons Mill, and Robinsons Rancho) is a census-designated place in Butte County, California. It lies at an elevation of 2654 feet (809 m). Robinson Mill's population was 80 at the 2010 census.

Demographics
At the 2010 census Robinson Mill had a population of 80. The racial makeup of Robinson Mill was 74 (92.5%) White, 0 (0.0%) African American, 1 (1.3%) Native American, 0 (0.0%) Asian, 1 (1.3%) Pacific Islander, 0 (0.0%) from other races, and 4 (5.0%) from two or more races. Hispanic or Latino of any race were 11 people (13.8%).

The whole population lived in households, no one lived in non-institutionalized group quarters and no one was institutionalized.

There were 37 households, 4 (10.8%) had children under the age of 18 living in them, 16 (43.2%) were opposite-sex married couples living together, 3 (8.1%) had a female householder with no husband present, 3 (8.1%) had a male householder with no wife present.  There were 2 (5.4%) unmarried opposite-sex partnerships, and 1 (2.7%) same-sex married couples or partnerships. 12 households (32.4%) were one person and 5 (13.5%) had someone living alone who was 65 or older. The average household size was 2.16.  There were 22 families (59.5% of households); the average family size was 2.64.

The age distribution was 8 people (10.0%) under the age of 18, 8 people (10.0%) aged 18 to 24, 11 people (13.8%) aged 25 to 44, 40 people (50.0%) aged 45 to 64, and 13 people (16.3%) who were 65 or older.  The median age was 53.8 years. For every 100 females, there were 95.1 males.  For every 100 females age 18 and over, there were 105.7 males.

There were 45 housing units at an average density of ,of which 37 were occupied, 32 (86.5%) by the owners and 5 (13.5%) by renters.  The homeowner vacancy rate was 0%; the rental vacancy rate was 16.7%.  68 people (85.0% of the population) lived in owner-occupied housing units and 12 people (15.0%) lived in rental housing units.

References

Census-designated places in Butte County, California
Census-designated places in California